Filippo Agomeri Antonelli (born 13 July 1978) is an Italian former footballer.

Football career

Agomeri Antonelli started his career at Monza, at that time Serie C1, after played one Serie B game for the club, he transferred to L'Aquila of Serie C2 Group C. He then moved to Pro Patria, in Serie C2 Group A.

He was signed by Cosenza in summer 2001, started his full Serie B season.

He was signed by Ascoli of Serie B in summer 2003. He won the Serie A promotion in summer 2005.

Chievo
Due to good performance in Ascoli, Chievo signed him in summer 2005, his first Serie A club. After made only one appearance, he was loaned to Messina in winter break, to help the club avoid relegation.

In summer 2006, he was loaned to Pescara Calcio. Team-mate Stefano Olivieri also joined the club in co-ownership deal.

Triestina
In July 2007, half of the registration rights was sold to Triestina for €110,000 in 2-year contract.

In January 2008, he played for U.C. AlbinoLeffe on loan. He was full contracted with Triestina in June 2008 for free.

Bari
On 20 July 2009, Bari signed the former Triestina right winger on a free transfer and until June 2011. In January 2010 he left for Torino in temporary deal, with Marco Pisano moved to Bari also in temporary deal.

Triestina
In August 2010, he returned to his former club Triestina for free, but after a good season with 33 caps and 1 goal, the club relegated in Lega Pro, his contract expired and he becomes a free agent.

Lega Pro
After the bankruptcy of Triestina, Antonelli joined Lumezzane in August 2011. In August 2012 he joined Reggiana, with Riccardo Carlini moved to opposite direction. Antonelli signed a 2-year contract.

Managerial career 
In May 2022, Antonelli was appointed sports director of newly-promoted Serie A side Monza. He remained until 30 November 2022.

References

External links
 Profile at La Gazzetta 
 

1978 births
Living people
Sportspeople from Chieti
Italian footballers
A.C. Monza players
L'Aquila Calcio 1927 players
Ascoli Calcio 1898 F.C. players
A.C. ChievoVerona players
Cosenza Calcio 1914 players
A.C.R. Messina players
Delfino Pescara 1936 players
S.S.C. Bari players
Serie A players
Serie B players
Association football midfielders
U.S. Triestina Calcio 1918 players
U.C. AlbinoLeffe players
Footballers from Abruzzo